Hemiarma marina is a monotypic species of cryptomonad discovered off the coast of Palau in 2016.

References